Fire museums, also known as firefighting museums are prevalent throughout the world.

Australia
The Old Perth Fire Station in Perth houses the Fire Safety Education Centre and Museum since 1985.  
The Fire Services Museum of Victoria is in Melbourne.
The Penrith Museum of Fire is located in Sydney.

Canada
 Canadian Fire Fighters Museum – Port Hope, Ontario.
 Fire Fighters Museum – Winnipeg, Manitoba
 Regional Firefighters Interpretation Center – Nova Scotia.

China
The Fire Services Museum in Macau opened in 1999.

Estonia
The Estonian Firefighting Museum in Tallinn was established in 1974.

Ireland
The Dublin Fire Brigade has a museum in the O'Brien Institute

Japan
The Yotsuya firefighting station in Shinjuku City houses an extensive museum spread over several floors. The 5th and 4th floors cover the history of firefighting in Tokyo, whereas the 3rd floor is dedicated to modern firefighting. The basement has several historical firefighting vehicles.

Poland

Fire museums in Poland include The Małopolska Museum of Fire Fighting in Alwernia, Museum of Firefighting in Kotuń, Museum of Firefighting in Krasnik,
Warmia and Mazury Museum of Firefighting in Lidzbark, Pomeranian Land Fire Fighting Museum in Łasin, Central Museum of Firefighting in Myslowice, Museum of Firefighting of Olkusz Land in Olkusz, Museum of Firefighting in Oseredek, Museum of Firefighting in Przeworsk, Museum of Fire Fighting in Przodkowo, Wielkopolskie Museum of Firefighting in Rakoniewice, Fire Fighting Museum in Szczuczyn, Fire Fighting Museum of TSO in Świecie, Fire Fighting Museum in Warsaw, Fire Fighting Historical and Educational Centre of Lodz Region in Wolborz, Museum of Fire in Żory.

Puerto Rico
Museo Parque de Bombas in Ponce, Puerto Rico, founded in 1990, is housed in a structure built in 1882.

Taiwan
Taiwan houses two fire museums, which are Fire Safety Museum of Taipei City Fire Department in Taipei and Hsinchu City Fire Museum in Hsinchu City.

United Kingdom
The Greater Manchester Fire Service Museum is in Rochdale and opened in 1983.  The Sheffield Fire and Police Museum opened in 1984 and is now called the National Emergency Services Museum. The Welsh Museum of Fire is situated in Neath.  The London Fire Brigade Museum is on Lambeth High Street.  The Museum of Fire was located in Edinburgh.

United States
Fire museums in the US include:

Arizona
Hall of Flame Fire Museum

California
African American Firefighter Museum
Los Angeles Fire Department Museum and Memorial

Colorado
Denver Firefighters Museum

Connecticut
Connecticut Fire Museum
Fireboat Fire Fighter Museum, Mystic Seaport, Mystic, Connecticut
Mystic Seaport Museum Firehouse, Mystic Seaport, Mystic, Connecticut

Florida
Jacksonville Fire Museum

Illinois
Aurora Regional Fire Museum

Iowa
International Fire Museum, Iowa

Maine
Hose 5 Fire Museum
Portland Fire Museum

Maryland 
Fire Museum of Maryland

Massachusetts
Boston Fire Museum
Falls Fire Barn Museum
New Bedford Fire Museum;

Michigan
Michigan Firehouse Museum
Upper Peninsula Fire Fighters Memorial Museum

Minnesota
Hinckley Fire Museum

New Jersey
Hoboken Fire Department Museum
Somerville Fire Department Museum

New York
Buffalo Fire Historical Museum
New York City Fire Museum

Ohio
Fire Museum of Greater Cincinnati

Oklahoma
Oklahoma State Firefighters Museum

Oregon
Uppertown Firefighter's Museum

Pennsylvania
Pennsylvania National Fire Museum
Reading Area Fire-Fighters Museum

South Carolina
North Charleston Fire Museum

Tennessee
Fire Museum of Memphis

Texas
Austin Fire Museum
Fire Museum of Texas
Houston Fire Museum

Puerto Rico
Parque de Bombas, Ponce, Puerto Rico

See also
List of fire stations (which includes many fire museums)

References

External links
List of World Firefighter Museums
Fire Museum Network
Tokyo Fire Museum - Learn about Tokyo's Past through its History of Fighting Fire